Thomas David Henshaw  (1939 – 23 March 2014) was a New Zealand cartoonist, known for his depictions of rural life in his "Jock" cartoons, in a career spanning over 40 years.  His cartoons were published in the New Zealand Farmer for 34 years. His cartoons were also published in the Manawatu Evening Standard, New Zealand Gardener, the Listener, Rod and Rifle, and Massey and Lincoln University capping magazines.

Born in Kimbolton, New Zealand in 1939, Henshaw was educated at Palmerston North Boys' High School. He then studied at Massey Agricultural College, completing the first year of a diploma in sheep farming, before going to Lincoln College where he gained a Diploma in Valuation and Farm Management.

He won the 2007 communicator of the year award from the Guild of Agricultural Journalists. In the 2011 New Year Honours, he was appointed an Officer of the New Zealand Order of Merit, for services as a cartoonist.

Publications
Henshaw published a number of books, either on his own or with other authors, or as illustrator.

As author/co-author

As illustrator

References

External links
 Photograph of Henshaw with Sir Anand Satyanand after receiving his ONZM insignia
Search for work by David Henshaw on DigitalNZ.

1939 births
2014 deaths
People from Manawatū-Whanganui
People educated at Palmerston North Boys' High School
Massey University alumni
Lincoln University (New Zealand) alumni
New Zealand cartoonists
Officers of the New Zealand Order of Merit